Peter Simon (born August 1949) is a British businessman who is the founder and owner of fashion retailer Monsoon Accessorize.

According to The Sunday Times Rich List, Simon has a net worth of £480 million.

Early life 
Born in Sri Lanka, he was educated at boarding school before going on to live in a naturist community in Ibiza.

On a road trip from London to Rajasthan, India via Turkey, Iran and Afghanistan, he has said he was inspired by the colour and local fashion.

Career 
In 1973, Simon started out selling woollen coats on Portobello Market, London. A year later Simon opened Monsoon's first physical outlet in Beauchamp Place, London.

The retail chain was originally known for retailing hippie clothes before Simon re-positioned the company as a mainstream female fashion brand.

In 1984, Simon opened the first branch of accessories retailer Accessorize. In 1989, Simon floated the combined company.

In 2007, Simon bought back all shares in the company held by external investors to become 100 percent owner. He had previously tried to acquire these shares in 2003 and 2004.

In 2014, Simon invested in homewear brand Loaf.

Personal life 
He married Kate Simon in 1977. The couple divorced in 2000. In 2017, his son George Simon, a property developer, was involved in a fatal car crash. He previously dated actress Jane Seymour. He has had six children.

A contemporary art collector, he is a trustee of the Tate Gallery. He started the Monsoon Art Collection in 2000.

In 2015, it was reported that he was planning to knock five homes into one in Chelsea, London, which was met with local dissent.

References 

1949 births
Living people
British chief executives
People from British Ceylon
British retail company founders